Off the Beaten Path is the third studio album by American country music artist Justin Moore. It was released on September 17, 2013 via Valory Music Group. The album includes duets with Miranda Lambert and Charlie Daniels. A deluxe edition was also made available.  The album has sold 364,000 copies in the US as of June 2016.

The album includes the singles "Point at You", "Lettin' the Night Roll" and "This Kind of Town".

Critical reception

Off the Beaten Path garnered generally positive reception by music critics to critique the album. At AllMusic, Stephen Thomas Erlewine felt that the release had "an air of authenticity." Markos Papadatos of Digital Journal proclaimed that Moore "stays true to his roots" on an album that was "highly eclectic and a real treat", and called the album "a well-crafted musical work". At Roughstock, Ashley Cooke wrote that "Justin Moore stays true to his cowboy hat, the Country way and the twang we've grown to love with Off The Beaten Path." In agreement, Raina Smith of Got Country Online felt that "Justin stays true to his cowboy hat and roots that’s for sure in this modern and traditional country music album." At The New York Times, Jon Caramanica wrote a positive review, and noted that Moore "engages in a bait and switch: cloaking old-school values with new-school references. He is in no way a dissenter, merely someone who understands that old forms can stand even stronger with injections of new ideas." Furthermore, Caraminica vowed that "Mr. Moore is solid in his convictions: that country music of the 1970s, the more accessible side of the outlaw years, is worth preserving, and that the true modern spirit of that sound is mindful of the rest of the world." However, Bob Paxman at Country Weekly evoked that the release "mostly serves up an array of clichéd, mediocre tunes about the majesty of the country lifestyle." At USA Today, Brian Mansfield told that Moore "may sing about small towns, heaven and redemptive love with unquestionable conviction", but he "just can't recover" to make his album truly special. In 2017, Billboard contributor Chuck Dauphin placed one track from the album on his top 10 list of Moore's best songs: "Point at You" at number eight.

Track listing

Personnel
 Jim "Moose" Brown - keyboards
 Perry Coleman - background vocals
 Roger Coleman - electric guitar
 Charlie Daniels - vocals on "For Some Ol' Redneck Reason"
 Shannon Forrest - drums
 Tommy Harden - drums
 Mike Johnson - steel guitar
 Doug Kahan - bass guitar
 Miranda Lambert - vocals on "Old Habits"
 Troy Lancaster - electric guitar
 Justin Moore - lead vocals
 Michael Rhodes - bass guitar
 Mike Rojas - keyboards
 Steve Sheehan - acoustic guitar
 Adam Shoenfeld - electric guitar
 Russell Terrell - background vocals

Chart performance

Weekly charts

Year-end charts

Singles

Certifications

References

2013 albums
Justin Moore albums
Big Machine Records albums
Albums produced by Jeremy Stover